In United States constitutional law, a suspect classification is a class or group of persons meeting a series of criteria suggesting they are likely the subject of discrimination. These classes receive closer scrutiny by courts when an Equal Protection claim alleging unconstitutional discrimination is asserted against a law, regulation, or other government action, or sometimes private action. When a law or government action affects a group that falls under a "suspect classification," courts apply the strict scrutiny standard in reviewing the constitutional validity of a law or action.

Criteria 
The United States Supreme Court has mentioned a variety of criteria that, in some combination, may qualify a group as a suspect class, but the Court has not declared that any particular set of criteria are either necessary or sufficient to qualify.

Some of the criteria that have been cited include:
 The group has historically been discriminated against or have been subject to prejudice, hostility, or stigma, perhaps due, at least in part, to stereotypes.
 They possess an immutable or highly visible trait.
 They are powerless to protect themselves via the political process. (The group is a "discrete" and "insular" minority.)
 The group's distinguishing characteristic does not inhibit it from contributing meaningfully to society.

Classification

Suspect class 
The Supreme Court  established the judicial precedent for suspect classifications in the cases of Hirabayashi v. United States, 320 U.S. 81  and Korematsu v. United States, 323 U.S. 214 (1944). The Supreme Court recognizes race, national origin, religion and alienage as suspect classes; it therefore analyzes any government action that discriminates against these classes under strict scrutiny.

In Perry v. Schwarzenegger, the U.S. District Court for the Northern District of California in its Findings of Fact commented  that sexual orientation could be considered a suspect class, but on the facts presented Proposition 8 failed even to satisfy the much more deferential rational basis review. The U.S. District Court for the District of Nebraska held the same in Citizens for Equal Protection v. Bruning, but was reversed on appeal by the United States Court of Appeals for the Eighth Circuit.

As the law currently stands, neither sexual orientation nor gender identity is considered a federal suspect class, although many states do consider them such.

Alienage 
Alienage, or the state of being an alien, i.e. a non-citizen of the United States, is a unique category. For purposes of state law, legal aliens are a suspect class (Graham v. Richardson, 403 U.S. 365 (1971)). As such, state actions are analyzed according to strict scrutiny. In contrast, because the United States Congress has the power to regulate immigration, federal government action that discriminates based on alienage will receive rational basis scrutiny. State acts that affect unlawful immigrants are generally analyzed with rational basis review unless the topic is education of children, in which case they are analyzed under intermediate scrutiny based on Plyler v. Doe, 457 U.S. 202 (1982).

Quasi-suspect class 
Intermediate scrutiny is applied to groups that fall under a "quasi-suspect classification." Sex and legitimacy of birth have been held to be quasi-suspect classes. In 2012, the U.S. District Court for 
Northern California discussed this type of classification, but applied heightened scrutiny without specifically labeling gays and lesbians a suspect or quasi-suspect class in its decision. Striking down Section 3 of DOMA as unconstitutional in Windsor v. United States (2012), the 2nd Circuit Court of Appeals held sexual orientation to be a quasi-suspect classification, and determined that laws that classify people on such basis should be subject to intermediate scrutiny. It was the first time a federal court had applied quasi-suspect classification in a sexual orientation case. The Supreme Court, however, has not decided whether sexual orientation fits into any identified class.

All others 

Rational basis scrutiny is applied to all other discriminatory statutes. Rational basis scrutiny currently covers all other discriminatory criteria—e.g., age, disability, wealth, political preference, political affiliation, or criminal conviction.

Levels of judicial review

Strict scrutiny 
To satisfy the strict scrutiny, suspect classifications such as race, alienage, or national origin must be necessary to promote a compelling state interest when there is no less restrictive alternative method available to accomplish the government (state's) interest.

The practical result of this legal doctrine is that government sponsored discrimination on the account of a citizen's race, skin color, ethnicity, religion, or national origin is almost always unconstitutional, unless it is a compelling, narrowly tailored and temporary piece of legislation dealing with national security, defense, or affirmative action. Korematsu v. United States, regarding Japanese internment, and Grutter v. Bollinger, upholding affirmative action based upon racial diversity, are the only cases in which a racially discriminatory law has been upheld under the strict scrutiny test.

Strict scrutiny is also applied to restrictions of any fundamental right, regardless of the group involved.

Intermediate scrutiny 
When intermediate scrutiny is involved, the courts are more likely to oppose the discriminatory law when compared to a rational basis review particularly if a law is based on gender. However, a court will likely uphold a discriminatory law under intermediate scrutiny if the law has an exceedingly persuasive justification and applies to real, fact-based, or biological differences between the sexes. Mississippi University for Women v. Hogan, 102 S.Ct. 3331 (1982), Nguyen v. INS, 121 S.Ct. 2053 (2001).

Rational basis 
When rational basis review is used, it means that the classification is one that overwhelmingly tends to be rational, e.g. distinguishing criminals from non-criminals. This leads to wide political discretion and a focus of judicial resources to other cases where the classification employed tends to be more suspicious, and thus close judicial balancing is needed.

Classifications under state law 
The Supreme Court's holdings impose a minimum standard to which each State must adhere. Hence, a State law that discriminates against citizens because of their race, must be reviewed by the applicable State and inferior federal courts using the strict scrutiny basis of review. A State may, generally, choose to give its citizens more rights or protections than the minimum federal standard when considering state law. For example, in 2008 the Supreme Court of California used the strict scrutiny basis of review to strike down a California statute denying legal recognition of same-sex marriages.

California classifies sexual orientation as a suspect class under state law. Connecticut and Iowa classify sexual orientation as a quasi-suspect class under their respective state laws.

See also
Tyranny of the majority

References

Civil rights and liberties

Legal doctrines and principles
Anti-discrimination law in the United States